Michael Tuck (born 24 June 1953) is a seven-time premiership-winning player, Australian rules footballer with the Hawthorn Football Club in the Victorian Football League (VFL) / Australian Football League (AFL). 

His 426 career games was a VFL/AFL record until it was broken by Brent Harvey of North Melbourne in Round 19 of 2016.

AFL career

Early career (1971–1973) 
Raised in Berwick, in Melbourne's outer south-eastern suburbs, Tuck joined Hawthorn in 1971 from the country zone club of the same name, and remained at the club for his entire career. Tuck initially played as a full forward and the understudy to the great Peter Hudson, kicking 63 goals in the VFL Reserves in 1971. He made his Senior debut against Richmond in the eighth round the following year and kicked goals with his first three kicks in senior football, but soon after lost form and was dropped from the senior side.
Tuck would play in Hawthorn's winning 1972 Reserve grade premiership side.

Rising career (1974–1985) 
In the following years Tuck was tried as a winger and defender before in 1974 finding his true niche as a ruck-rover and firmly establishing himself in the Hawthorn senior side. With Don Scott and Leigh Matthews, Tuck came to form a following combination feared by every other VFL club and a crucial role in Hawthorn's 1976 and 1978 premierships. Tuck was a team leader as Hawthorn appeared in seven successive grand finals between 1983 and 1989. In the last four years of his career Tuck was moved from the ball to the less demanding role of a running half-back flanker, but he still averaged over 17 possessions per game in the final years of his career.

Captaincy (1986–1991)
Tuck was the natural successor to the Hawthorn captaincy in 1986 after Leigh Matthews' retirement. He captained them from that year until his retirement in 1991 at the age of 38. He won a total of seven VFL/AFL premierships with Hawthorn, captaining the club in four of them.

Tuck never won Hawthorn's best-and-fairest, but was runner-up on six occasions, and there was a good deal of controversy in 1982 and 1983 when he failed to poll a single vote in the Brownlow Medal, which led to votes for each match being made publicly available for the first time ever in 1984.

His last game was in Hawthorn's premiership win in the 1991 Grand Final over West Coast, at Waverley Park.

Records

VFL/AFL
Tuck holds a number of VFL/AFL games records. These are:
 Most senior games for Hawthorn: 426
 Most VFL/AFL grand finals: 11
 Most VFL/AFL premiership wins: 7
 Most VFL/AFL games without winning a club best and fairest: 426

He retired as the tenth-oldest VFL/AFL player ever, at 38 years and 95 days old.

Tuck's 426 games was a VFL/AFL record until it was broken by Brent Harvey in Round 19 of 2016; Harvey retired at the end of that season having played 432 premiership games.

Elite Australian rules football

In elite Australian rules football (the VFL/AFL, SANFL and WAFL), Tuck's 426 career premiership games was a record until broken by Craig Bradley in Round 6 of the 2001 AFL season: Bradley retired at the end of the 2002 AFL season after 464 games (89 for Port Adelaide in the SANFL and 375 for Carlton), and remains the record holder as of 2022. 

As of 2022, Tuck's total of 426 premiership games is ranked fourth behind Bradley, Shaun Burgoyne (433, including 26 SANFL matches for Port Adelaide) and Harvey.

Other matches
Tuck also played 11 matches for Victoria in State of Origin football, and 29 pre-season/night series matches (which are counted as senior in the SANFL and WAFL but not the VFL/AFL). If these are included, Tuck played a total of 466 career senior games. 

The VFL/AFL record Tuck's total as 437 career senior games, excluding his pre-season/night series matches.

Depending on the viewpoint taken:

 The VFL/AFL's total of 437 was an elite Victorian football record until broken by Harvey (who also played 11 International Rules matches, which are counted as senior by the AFL) in Round 16 of 2016, while Harvey retired with 445 senior career games (Harvey also played two matches for Victoria in State of Origin).
 If Harvey's International Rules matches are excluded, Tuck's overall total of 466 was an elite Victorian football record until broken by Harvey in Round 10 of 2016, while Harvey retired with 480 senior career games.
 If Harvey's International Rules matches are included, Tuck's overall total of 466 was an elite Victorian football record until broken by Harvey in the first pre-season round of 2016, while Harvey   retired with 491 senior career games.

As of 2022, Tuck's total of 437 career senior matches (using the AFL/VFL's total) ranks seventh behind Bradley (501), Peter Carey (467), Greg Phillips (447), Russell Ebert (446), Harvey (445) and Burgoyne (438), while the overall total of 466 career senior matches ranks fourth (if International Rules matches are excluded) behind Bradley (519), Harvey (480) and Carey, or fifth (if International Rules matches are included) behind Bradley (528), Harvey (491) and Carey and Burgoyne (equal on 467).

Statistics

|- style="background-color: #EAEAEA"
| scope="row" | 1972 ||  || 17
| 5 || 3 || 3 || 49 || 56 || 7 || 7 ||  || 0.6 || 0.6 || 9.8 || 1.4 || 11.2 || 1.4 ||  || 0
|-
| scope="row" | 1973 ||  || 17
| 11 || 2 || 3 || 111 || 7 || 118 || 16 ||  || 0.2 || 0.3 || 10.1 || 0.6 || 10.7 || 1.5 ||  || 0
|- style="background-color: #EAEAEA"
| scope="row" | 1974 ||  || 17
| 23 || 23 || 19 || 374 || 44 || 418 || 67 ||  || 1.0 || 0.8 || 16.3 || 1.9 || 18.2 || 2.9 ||  || 1
|-
| scope="row" | 1975 ||  || 17
| 24 || 20 || 25 || 414 || 44 || 458 || 61 ||  || 0.8 || 1.1 || 18.0 || 1.9 || 19.9 || 2.7 ||  || 4
|- style="background-color: #EAEAEA"
| scope="row" bgcolor=F0E68C | 1976# ||  || 17
| 25 || 15 || 19 || 435 || 109 || 544 || 72 ||  || 0.6 || 0.8 || 17.4 || 4.4 || 21.8 || 2.9 ||  || 4
|-
| scope="row" | 1977 ||  || 17
| 25 || 13 || 11 || 453 || 114 || 567 || 82 ||  || 0.5 || 0.5 || 18.1 || 4.6 || 22.7 || 3.3 ||  || 20
|- style="background-color: #EAEAEA"
| scope="row" bgcolor=F0E68C | 1978# ||  || 17
| 25 || 18 || 25 || bgcolor=CAE1FF | 490† || 134 || 624 || 89 ||  || 0.7 || 1.0 || 19.6 || 5.4 || 25.0 || 3.6 ||  || 14
|-
| scope="row" | 1979 ||  || 17
| 22 || 20 || 27 || 419 || 126 || 545 || 68 ||   || 0.9 || 1.2 || 19.0 || 5.7 || 24.8 || 3.1 ||  || 12
|- style="background-color: #EAEAEA"
| scope="row" | 1980 ||  || 17
| 19 || 15 || 24 || 282 || 103 || 385 || 68 ||  || 0.8 || 1.3 || 14.8 || 5.4 || 20.3 || 3.6 ||  || 2
|-
| scope="row" | 1981 ||  || 17
| 21 || 32 || 31 || 300 || 110 || 410 || 84 ||  || 1.5 || 1.5 || 14.3 || 5.2 || 19.5 || 4.0 ||  || 6
|- style="background-color: #EAEAEA"
| scope="row" | 1982 ||  || 17
| 25 || 37 || 28 || 374 || 160 || 534 || 73 ||  || 1.5 || 1.1 || 15.0 || 6.4 || 21.4 || 2.9 ||  || 0
|-
| scope="row" bgcolor=F0E68C | 1983# ||  || 17
| 20 || 33 || 22 || 350 || 98 || 448 || 75 ||  || 1.7 || 1.1 || 17.5 || 4.9 || 22.4 || 3.8 ||  || 0
|- style="background-color: #EAEAEA"
| scope="row" | 1984 ||  || 17
| 20 || 21 || 14 || 296 || 92 || 388 || 45 ||  || 1.1 || 0.7 || 14.8 || 4.6 || 19.4 || 2.3 ||  || 8
|-
| scope="row" | 1985 ||  || 17
| 23 || 23 || 18 || 305 || 106 || 411 || 63 ||  || 1.0 || 0.8 || 13.3 || 4.6 || 17.9 || 2.7 ||  || 1
|- style="background-color: #EAEAEA"
| scope="row" bgcolor=F0E68C | 1986# ||  || 17
| 24 || 13 || 14 || 295 || 179 || 474 || 67 ||  || 0.5 || 0.6 || 12.3 || 7.5 || 19.8 || 2.8 ||  || 5
|-
| scope="row" | 1987 ||  || 17
| 26 || 17 || 14 || 348 || 165 || 513 || 62 || bgcolor=CAE1FF| 73† || 0.7 || 0.5 || 13.4 || 6.3 || 19.7 || 2.4 || 2.8 || 14
|- style="background-color: #EAEAEA"| scope="row" bgcolor=F0E68C | 1988# ||  || 17
| 22 || 4 || 10 || 246 || 132 || 378 || 46 || 40 || 0.2 || 0.5 || 11.2 || 6.0 || 17.2 || 2.1 || 1.8 || 1
|-
| scope="row" bgcolor=F0E68C | 1989# ||  || 17
| 23 || 5 || 9 || 284 || 121 || 405 || 64 || 47 || 0.2 || 0.4 || 12.3 || 5.3 || 17.6 || 2.8 || 2.0 || 6
|- style="background-color: #EAEAEA"
| scope="row" | 1990 ||  || 17
| 22 || 2 || 5 || 299 || 125 || 424 || 65 || 45 || 0.1 || 0.2 || 13.6 || 5.7 || 19.3 || 3.0 || 2.0 || 0
|-
| scope="row" bgcolor=F0E68C | 1991# ||  || 17
| 21 || 4 || 4 || 229 || 94 || 323 || 48 || 55 || 0.2 || 0.2 || 10.9 || 4.5 || 15.4 || 2.3 || 2.6 || 6
|- class="sortbottom"
! colspan=3| Career
! 426 !! 320 !! 325 !! 6353 !! 2070 !! 8423 !! 1222 !! 260 !! 0.8 !! 0.8 !! 14.9 !! 4.9 !! 19.8 !! 2.9 !! 2.3 !! 104
|}

Honours and achievementsTeam 7× VFL/AFL premiership player: 1976, 1978, 1983, 1986, 1988, 1989, 1991
 4× Minor premiership: 1975, 1986, 1988, 1989Individual 4× VFL/AFL premiership captain: 1986, 1988, 1989, 1991
 2× All-Australian team: 1979, 1983
 2× VFL Team of the Year: 1983, 1990
 AFLPA best captain: 1986
 Hawthorn captain: 1986-1991
 2× Victoria Australian rules football team: 1983, 1984
 Australian Football Hall of Fame Hawthorn Hall of Fame – Legend status Hawthorn Team of the Century Hawthorn life member'''

Legacy
Tuck was a skinny ruck-rover with great stamina as evidenced by the length of his career. He held the record as the VFL/AFL games record holder with 426 senior games, from his retirement until 30 July 2016, when the record was broken by North Melbourne's Brent Harvey. However, Tuck's durability is not only reflected in the number of senior games he played but also in having played fifty games for Hawthorn's reserves before becoming a regular senior player. Tuck also polled 104 Brownlow votes for his career, but never came close to winning the award.

Two of his sons have played in the AFL: Shane Tuck for Richmond, and Travis Tuck for Hawthorn.

The medal presented to the best afield in the preseason cup final was named after him in 1992, as was a grandstand at Glenferrie Oval. He was inducted into the Australian Football Hall of Fame in 1996.

Coaching career
Tuck briefly served as a reserves coach at Geelong, under former Hawks teammate Gary Ayres.

Personal life
Tuck is the brother-in-law of former Geelong player Gary Ablett, Sr., having married Fay Ablett.

See also
 List of VFL/AFL players to have played 300 games
 List of VFL/AFL records

Footnotes

References 
 
 AFL: Hall of Fame
 

Hawthorn Football Club players
Hawthorn Football Club Premiership players
Australian Football Hall of Fame inductees
All-Australians (1953–1988)
Victorian State of Origin players
1953 births
Living people
Australian rules footballers from Melbourne
Seven-time VFL/AFL Premiership players
People from Berwick, Victoria